Lionel Sackville-West, 2nd Baron Sackville, GCMG (19 July 1827 – 3 September 1908), was a British diplomat.

Background
Sackville-West was the fourth son of George Sackville-West, 5th Earl De La Warr, by Lady Elizabeth, daughter of John Sackville, 3rd Duke of Dorset. He was the younger brother of George West, Viscount Cantelupe, Charles Sackville-West, 6th Earl De La Warr and Mortimer Sackville-West, 1st Baron Sackville.

Diplomatic career
Sackville-West was Minister Plenipotentiary to Argentina from 1872 to 1878 and Ambassador to Spain from 1878 to 1881. Then, he was appointed Envoy Extraordinary and Minister Plenipotentiary to the United States, a post he held until 1888, when he retired for writing of the Murchison letter. In 1888, he also succeeded his elder brother Mortimer in the barony of Sackville.

Family
Lord Sackville had seven children by a Spanish dancer, Josefa de la Oliva (née Durán y Ortega, known as Pepita). Soon after his death one of these, calling himself Ernest Henri Jean Baptiste Sackville-West, claimed to be a lawful son and his father's heir. He asserted that between 1863 and 1867 Sackville-West had married his mother. The case came before the English courts of law in 1909–1910, and it was decided that the children of this union were all illegitimate, as Pepita's husband, Juan Antonio Gabriel de Oliva, was alive during the whole period of his wife's connection with Sackville-West. Lord Sackville died in September 1908, aged 81, and was succeeded by his nephew, Lionel, who married his cousin, Lord Sackville's daughter Victoria. They were the parents of Vita Sackville-West.

References

Sources

 Campbell, Charles S. "The Dismissal of Lord Sackville." Mississippi Valley Historical Review 44.4 (1958): 635-648 online.
 Brooks, George. "Anglophobia in the United States: Some Light on the Presidential Election." Westminster Review (130.1 (1888): 736-756 online.

External links

Lionel Sackville-West, 2nd Baron Sackville (person), Everything2

1827 births
1908 deaths
Barons in the Peerage of the United Kingdom
Knights Grand Cross of the Order of St Michael and St George
Younger sons of earls
Younger sons of barons
Diplomatic peers
Lionel
Ambassadors of the United Kingdom of Great Britain and Ireland to Spain
Ambassadors of the United Kingdom to Argentina
Ambassadors of the United Kingdom to the United States